Indianapolis Contemporary, formerly known as the Indianapolis Museum of Contemporary Art or  iMOCA,  was a museum of contemporary art in Indianapolis, Indiana, U.S. In 2020, the gallery's board voted to begin closing down operations, a result of financial strains caused by COVID-19.

History
Founded in 2001 as a “museum without walls”,  iMOCA mounted exhibitions around the city. In 2004, the museum opened as a gallery in the historic Emelie Building in the Indiana Avenue Cultural District. In December 2009, iMOCA moved to a larger space in the Murphy Art Center in the Fountain Square Arts District. In 2014, the museum opened a second gallery space in The Alexander Hotel at CityWay.

The iMOCA vacated the Murphy Art Center in late 2016. It continued to offer exhibits in The Alexander Hotel, Cat Head Press in the Englewood neighborhood, Indiana Landmarks, and the Hoosier Salon. However, in January 2019 it cancelled plans for a permanent location and stated that it would again be a "museum without walls", with pop-up exhibits at various locations.

Indianapolis Contemporary was the only Indianapolis institution entirely dedicated to showcasing contemporary artists.

Since 2003, iMOCA had presented more than 40 exhibitions featuring the work of more than 75 local, regional, and international artists despite a modest exhibition budget. The museum had partnerships with other organizations such as the Indianapolis Symphony Orchestra and Indianapolis Public Library.

References

External links
Official website

Museums in Indianapolis
Art museums and galleries in Indiana
Contemporary art galleries in the United States
Modern art museums in the United States
Art museums established in 2001
2001 establishments in Indiana
Defunct museums in Indiana
2020 disestablishments in Indiana